Ronald Kroon (17 September 1942, Amsterdam – 12 July 2001, Huizen) was a Dutch freestyle swimmer who won two bronze medals at the 1962 European Aquatics Championships. He also competed at the 1960 and 1964 Summer Olympics with the best achievement of 8th place in the 4×100 meters medley relay. Between 1960 and 1964 he was four times national champion and set 12 national records in the 100 m freestyle event. He was the first Dutch athlete to swim 100 meters within 55 seconds.

After his swimming career, Kroon became a photographer with photograph press agency Anefo (1965-1968), and contributing editor at AVRO Sportpanorama in the seventies.

Some photographs by Ron Kroon

References

External links 

 
 Profile at RKD
 8,000 photographs by Kroon at the Dutch National Archives

1942 births
2001 deaths
Dutch male freestyle swimmers
Olympic swimmers of the Netherlands
Swimmers at the 1960 Summer Olympics
Swimmers at the 1964 Summer Olympics
Swimmers from Amsterdam
European Aquatics Championships medalists in swimming
Journalists from Amsterdam
Photographers from Amsterdam
20th-century Dutch journalists